Berengaria of Portugal (c. 1198 – 27 March 1221) was a Portuguese infanta (princess) and  Queen of Denmark, by marriage to King Valdemar II. She was the fifth daughter of King Sancho I of Portugal and Dulce of Aragon. She was the mother of Danish kings Eric IV, Abel and Christopher I.

Life
Berengaria was the tenth of eleven children born to her parents. By the age of fourteen in 1212, Berengaria was an orphan; her father died in 1212, while her mother had died in 1198. In various annals and ballads she is called Bringenilæ, Bengerd, Bengjerd and related forms.

Marriage
Berengaria was introduced to King Valdemar through his sister, Ingeborg, the wife of King Philip II of France, another of her cousins; she was by that time at the French court, having left Portugal with her brother Ferrante in 1212.

Old folk ballads say that on her deathbed, Dagmar of Bohemia, Valdemar's first wife, begged the king to marry Kirsten, the daughter of Karl von Rise and not the "beautiful flower" Berengaria. In other words, she predicted Berengaria's sons' fight over the throne would bring trouble to Denmark, although this is merely legend and there is no historical proof of this.

Queen
Valdemar's first wife, Dagmar of Bohemia, had been immensely popular, blonde and with Nordic looks. Queen Berengaria was the opposite, described as a dark-eyed, raven-haired beauty.

The Danes made up folk songs about Berengaria and blamed her for the high taxes Valdemar levied, although the taxes went to his war efforts, not just to his wife. The great popularity of the former queen made it difficult for the new queen to gain popularity in Denmark. She is noted to have made donations to churches and convents. Berengaria was the first Danish queen known to have worn a crown, which is mentioned in the inventory of her possessions (1225).

In 1221 Berengaria, after giving birth to three future kings, died in childbirth. Queen Berengaria is buried in St. Bendt's Church in Ringsted, Denmark, on one side of Valdemar II, with Queen Dagmar buried on the other side of the King.

Legacy

King Valdemar's two wives play a prominent role in Danish ballads and myths – Queen Dagmar as the soft, pious and popular ideal wife and Queen Berengaria (Bengjerd) as the beautiful and haughty woman.

Issue
 Eric IV of Denmark (1216–1250), King of the Danes (1241–1250)
 Sophie (1217–1247), married John I, Margrave of Brandenburg
 Abel of Denmark (1218–1252), King of the Danes (1250–1252)
 Christopher I of Denmark (1219–1259), King of the Danes (1252–1259)
 Stillborn child (1221)

References

Sources

  Dansk Kvindebiografisk Leksikon (In Danish)

External links

|-

1190s births
1221 deaths
12th-century Danish people
12th-century Portuguese people
13th-century Danish people
13th-century Portuguese people
12th-century Danish women
12th-century Portuguese women
13th-century Danish women
13th-century Portuguese women
Burials at St. Bendt's Church, Ringsted
Danish royal consorts
Deaths in childbirth
House of Burgundy-Portugal
Portuguese infantas
Daughters of kings